The 2017–18 Armenian First League season was the 26th since its establishment. The season was launched on August 7, 2017, and concluded on May 28, 2018. Banants-2 were the defending champions from the previous season.

Team changes
3 newly founded teams have joined the 2017–18 Armenian First League season:
Lori FC from Vanadzor, Lori Province
Artsakh FC from Yerevan
FC Ararat-Moskva Yerevan from Yerevan (played as FC Avan Academy during the 1st half of the season)

Stadiums and locations
10 teams will take part in this season's competition, of which only 4 teams -Artsakh, Erebuni, Lori, and Ararat-Moskva- are eligible to get the promotion right to the 2018–19 Armenian Premier League by the end of the competition. The remaining 6 teams are the reserve teams of the football clubs currently participating in the Armenian Premier League competition.

 1Erebuni will play at the Kasaghi Marzik Stadium, Ashtarak, instead of their own Erebuni Stadium, Yerevan. However, the team used several stadiums in Yerevan until matchday 9.
 2Lori will play at the main training pitch of the Vanadzor Football Academy due to the rebuilding of their regular venue Vanadzor City Stadium, Vanadzor.

Personnel and sponsorship

1. On the back of shirt, upside.
2. On the back of shirt, downside.
3. Died of a car accident on August 30, 2017 (after matchday 4).
4. Left the team at the end of the 1st half of the season (after matchday 14).

League table

Season statistics

Top scorers
As of 28 May 2018

References

External links

Armenian First League seasons
2017–18 in Armenian football
Armenia